Ruben Bemelmans and Philipp Petzschner won the title, beating Ken Skupski and Neal Skupski 7–5, 6–2

Seeds

Draw

Draw

References
 Main Draw

Bauer Watertechnology Cup - Doubles
2015 Doubles